Koumala Airport  was a rural airstrip in the Bamingui-Bangoran prefecture of the Central African Republic.

Aerial photos show the remains of an airstrip overgrown with trees.

See also

Transport in the Central African Republic
List of airports in the Central African Republic

References

External links 

Defunct airports
Airports in the Central African Republic
Buildings and structures in Bamingui-Bangoran